Duncan Creek is a stream in Monroe and Shelby counties in the U.S. state of Missouri. It is a tributary of Crooked Creek.

Duncan Creek has the name of William Duncan, original owner of the site.

See also
List of rivers of Missouri

References

Rivers of Monroe County, Missouri
Rivers of Shelby County, Missouri
Rivers of Missouri